Ali Osman Renklibay (born 24 October 1948) is a Turkish professional football coach and a former player who played as a forward.

Playing career
Renkiblay began his training in his native Konya with Konya Anadolu Selçukspor. He is the only player to be the top scorer in the top three divisions of the Turkish Football Federation; with Ceyhanspor in the TFF Second League, with Adanaspor in the TFF First League, and with Ankaragücü in the Süper Lig.

Managerial career
After retiring as a professional footballer, Renklibay worked as a civil engineer before returning as a manager for various Turkish teams.

References

External links
 
  (as coach)
 

Living people
1948 births
Sportspeople from Konya
Turkish footballers
Association football forwards
Turkey youth international footballers
Süper Lig players
TFF First League players
TFF Second League players
Adanaspor footballers
MKE Ankaragücü footballers
Turkish football managers
Süper Lig managers
Konyaspor managers
MKE Ankaragücü managers
İstanbul Başakşehir F.K. managers
Göztepe S.K. managers